Saboula is a rural commune in the Cercle of Kita in the Kayes Region of south-western Mali. The commune contains four villages and in the 2009 census had a population of 6,193. The principal town is Balandougou.

References

External links
.

Communes of Kayes Region